Duns Rugby Football Club is a rugby union side based in Duns in Borders, Scotland.

They are known as 'The Dingers' from the town motto, "Duns Dings A" (Duns Beats All).

Membership of Governing Body

Duns are a full member club of the Scottish Rugby Union and are in the SRU's East region, section 1 (Scottish Borders).

Home Venue
They play at Castle Park, located at Berwickshire's old High School. The club works in close co-operation with Duns Minis and Colts, who organise rugby at primary school and early secondary school level and are officially associated with the club, and the Berwickshire High School, which has squads for various age groups and play friendly matches.

Youth Rugby

Duns RFC operates various teams at youth level, within the Borders region.

References

Scottish rugby union teams
Rugby union clubs in the Scottish Borders
Rugby clubs established in 1878